The Heliopolis Palace ("Palace of the Presidency of the Republic" or  , "Federation Palace".) is one of the three Egyptian presidential palaces and residences, the others being Montaza Palace and Ras el-Tin Palace, for the executive office of the President of Egypt. It is located in the suburb of Heliopolis, northeast of central Cairo and east of the Nile in Egypt. It was originally built as the grand Heliopolis Palace Hotel in 1910. Now it is for the use of the President of Egypt.

History

Heliopolis Palace Hotel (1910–1958)

The palace was originally built as the luxurious Heliopolis Palace Hotel in the open desert from 1908 to 1910, while development of the new suburb began around it, by the Heliopolis Oases Company was ongoing. The hotel was designed by Ernest Jaspar as part of the larger Heliopolis project being done by Édouard Empain.

Billed as the most luxurious hotel in Africa and the Middle East, the Heliopolis Palace Hotel became, because of its grand architecture, an exclusive destination for guests including foreign royalty and international business tycoons. Guests included Milton S. Hershey and King Albert I and Queen Elisabeth of Belgium.

During the First World War, the Heliopolis Palace Hotel was transformed into a military hospital for Australian troops. The hospital employed students and nuns from the nearby Collège du Sacré-Cœur. The hospital was one of the largest and grandest in the campaign and was referred to in Australian press as "the Hospital in a palace." It made use of ambulances and had beds and tents lined up for miles along the road, making it able to treat thousands of Commonwealth troops at a time.

Interim (1958–1980)
In 1958, the hotel was purchased by the Egyptian government and closed. It was used to house government offices.

Presidential palace
In the 1980s, after extensive renovation and restoration efforts, the building became an Egyptian presidential palace and the headquarters of the administration of the new president, Hosni Mubarak. Today it is perhaps one of the more restricted presidential palaces regarding access. It is surrounded by simple gardens.

Architecture
The landmark hotel was designed by Belgian architect Ernest Jaspar. He introduced the local Heliopolis style of architecture, a synthesis of Persian, Moorish Revival, Islamic, and European Neoclassical architecture. It was built by the contracting firms Leon Rolin & Co. and Padova, Dentamaro & Ferro, the two largest civil contractors in Egypt then. Siemens & Schuepert of Berlin fitted the hotel's web of electric cables and installations. The utilities were to the most modern standards of their day.  The hotel operations were under French administered management.

The Heliopolis architectural style, responsible for many wonderful original buildings in Heliopolis, was exceptionally expressed in the Heliopolis Palace Hotel's exterior and interior design. The hotel had 400 rooms, including 55 private apartments. Beyond the Moorish Revival reception hall two public rooms were lavishly decorated in the Louis XIV and the Louis XV styles. Beyond those was the Central Hall, the primary public dining space with a classic symmetrical and elegant beauty.

The Central Hall's dome, awe inspiring to guests, measured  from floor to ceiling. The  hall's architectural interior was designed by Alexander Marcel of the French Institute, and decorated by Georges-Louis Claude. Twenty-two Italian marble columns circled the parquet floor up to the elaborate ceilings. The hall was carpeted with fine Persian carpets and had large mirrored wall panels and a substantial marble fireplace. To one side of the Central Hal was the Grillroom seating 150 guests, and to the other was the billiards hall, with two full-sized British Thurston billiard tables and a 'priceless' French one. The private banquet halls were quite large and elaborate.

The mahogany furniture was ordered from Maple's of London. Damascus-made 'East Orient style' lamps, lanterns, and chandeliers hung throughout, suspended like stalactite pendants. The upper gallery contained oak-paneled reading and card rooms furnished by Krieger of Paris. The basement and staff areas were so large that a narrow gauge railway was installed running the length of the hotel, passing by offices, kitchens, pantries, refrigerators, storerooms and the staff mess.

See also
Ancient Heliopolis
Modern Heliopolis
New Heliopolis City
Cairo Electric Railways and Heliopolis Oases Company

References

Bibliography

External links
Flickr results: Heliopolis Palace Hotel in vintage photographs

History of Cairo
Palaces in Cairo
Defunct hotels
Presidential palaces in Egypt
Hotel buildings completed in 1910
Architecture in Egypt
Moorish Revival architecture
Neoclassical architecture in Egypt
1910 establishments in Egypt
Hotels established in 1910
Hotels disestablished in 1958
1958 disestablishments in Egypt